Grigory Afanasyevich Verjbitsky (born January 25, 1875, Letychiv,  Podolia Governorate  — died December 20, 1942 Tianjin, China) was one of the leaders of the White movement in Transbaikal and Primoriye during the Russian Civil War, Lieutenant-General (1918).

Verjbitsky was graduated from the Odessa Infantry Engineering School in 1897. He was a participant of the Russo-Japanese War and World War I and he became a colonel in 1915. Verjbitsky joined the Omsk Provisional Government of Admiral Kolchak and was appointed as a commander of the 3rd Steppe Siberian Corps becoming Lieutenant-General.

After the defeat of Admiral Kolchak's armies in the Ural and Western Siberia, Verzhbitsky took part in the Great Siberian Ice march. After arrival at Chita, Ataman Grigory Semyonov trusted into his hands the 2nd Separate Rifle Corps of the Far Eastern Army from February to August 23, 1920. Verjbitsky escaped to China and even was a deputy of the Constituent Assembly of the Far Eastern Republic but did not participate in its work.

He headed the Provisional Priamurye Government Army of Spiridon Dionisovich Merkulov from 1921 to 1922. After the final defeat from the Soviets Verzhbitsky settled down in Harbin heading the branch of the Russian All-Military Union. The Japanese sent him to Tianjin in 1934, where he died eight years later.

Verjbitsky was awarded with:
 Order of St. George of the Fourth Degree
 Order of St. George of the Third Degree
 Order of St. Anna, 2nd class
 Order of St. Anna, 4th class
 Order of Saint Stanislaus (Imperial House of Romanov), 3rd class
 Order of St. Vladimir, 4th class
 Cross of St. George with a palm branch by his soldiers.

References
Бушин А. Ю. Во имя России: генерал-лейтенант Г. А. Вержбицкий // Белая армия. Белое дело. — Екатеринбург. — 2000. — № 7.

1875 births
1942 deaths
People from Letychiv
White movement generals
White Russian emigrants to China
Russian All-Military Union members
History of Zabaykalsky Krai
Primorsky Krai
Russian military personnel of the Russo-Japanese War
Russian military personnel of World War I
People of the Russian Civil War
Recipients of the Order of St. George of the Third Degree
Recipients of the Order of St. Anna, 2nd class
Recipients of the Order of Saint Stanislaus (Russian), 3rd class
Recipients of the Order of St. Vladimir, 4th class
Recipients of the Cross of St. George